Live in Chicago is a live album by The Apples in Stereo that was released exclusively as an online MP3 download from Emusic in 2001. The album was recorded at Schubas Tavern, Chicago, Illinois on April 26, 2000.

Though the album is no longer available, the cover song "Heroes and Villains" can be found on the 2001 EP Let's Go!

Track listing 
All tracks are written by Robert Schneider except where noted.

"I Can't Believe"
"Ruby"
"Go!"
"Seems So"
"What's the #"
"Heroes and Villains" (Brian Wilson, Van Dyke Parks)
"Get There Fine"
"Show the World"
"Dots 1, 2, 3" (J. McIntyre, R. Schneider)

The Apples in Stereo albums
2001 live albums
SpinART Records live albums